Mark Ryder (born Mark James Rydquist) is an English electronic musician, producer and DJ. His best-known release is the UK garage single "Joy" (2001) which reached No. 34 on the UK Singles Chart and number one on the UK Dance Singles Chart.

Biography
In 1988, Ryder founded his label, Strictly Underground Records. He was in the group M-D-Emm, which formed in 1988 and consisted of Ryder, Dave Lee (a.k.a. Joey Negro) and Emmanuel Cheal, releasing house music. Along with his brother Mike James (Michael James Rydquist), also a producer, the duo have released records under several aliases. As a solo artist, Ryder has released many records since 1990 under numerous aliases in the breakbeat hardcore, drum and bass, house and UK garage genres. He has also released many mixed compilation albums on his Strictly Underground label.

References

External links

English electronic musicians
English record producers
English house musicians
English drum and bass musicians
DJs from London
Breakbeat hardcore musicians
UK garage musicians
Musicians from London
People from Romford
Electronic dance music DJs
Living people
Relentless Records artists
Year of birth missing (living people)